Hemigrapha is a genus of fungi in the family Parmulariaceae. According to the 2007 Outline of Ascomycota, the placement of this genus within the family is uncertain.

Species
Hemigrapha asteriscus
Hemigrapha atlantica
Hemigrapha nephromatis
Hemigrapha phaeospora
Hemigrapha pilocarpacearum
Hemigrapha pseudocyphellariae
Hemigrapha strigulae
Hemigrapha tenellula

References

External links 

 Hemigrapha at Index Fungorum

Parmulariaceae
Taxa named by Johannes Müller Argoviensis